Partial general elections were held in Luxembourg on 9 and 16 June 1914, electing 31 out of 52 members of the Chamber of Deputies.

Results

References

Luxembourg
1914 in Luxembourg
1914
June 1914 events